Nikita Vladimirovich Bogoslovsky (22 May 1913, Saint Petersburg – 4 April 2004, Moscow) was a Soviet and Russian composer. Author of more than 300 songs, 8 symphonies (1940–1991), 17 operettas and musical comedies, 58 soundtracks, and 52 scores for theater productions. Many of his songs were made for film.

Bogoslovsky was born into an aristocratic family. He studied composition with Alexander Glazunov in 1927–1928 and as an audit at Leningrad Conservatory in 1930–1934.

He is best known for two Mark Bernes's trademark songs from the war film Two Soldiers (1943): "Tyomnaya noch" (Dark Is the Night) and "Shalandy polnye kefali" (Boats Full of Mullets).

In the post-Stalin period, Bogoslovsky was particularly successful with music for comedies. His output ranged from pop to folklore and neoclassical symphonic tunes.

Among his many honorary titles and state awards were People's Artist of the USSR (1983), Order of the Red Banner of Labour (1971), and Order of the Red Star (1946).

Filmography 
 Treasure Island (Остров сокровищ, 1938)
 A Great Life (Большая жизнь, 1939)
 The Fighters (Истребители, 1939)
 Mysterious Island (Таинственный остров, 1941)
 Alexander Parkhomenko (Александр Пархоменко, 1942)
A Good Lad (Славный малый, 1942)
 Two Soldiers (Два бойца, 1943)
 It Happened in the Donbas (Это было в Донбассе, 1945)
Fifteen-Year-Old Captain (Пятнадцатилетний капитан, 1945)
 A Crazy Day (Безумный день, 1956)
Different Fortunes (Разные судьбы, 1956)
 20,000 Leagues Across the Land (Леон Гаррос ищет друга, 1960)
Thrice Resurrected (Трижды воскресший, 1960)
It Was I Who Drew the Little Man (Человечка нарисовал я, 1960)
 Dog Barbos and Unusual Cross (Пёс Барбос и необычный кросс, 1961)
 Bootleggers (Самогонщики, 1961)
No Fear, No Blame (Без страха и упрёка, 1962)
 An Easy Life (Лёгкая жизнь, 1964)
 The Mysterious Monk (Таинственный монах, 1967)
Ilf and Petrov Rode a Tram (Ехали в трамвае Ильф и Петров, 1972)
 The Headless Horseman (Всадник без головы, 1973)

References

Video 
 , Nikita Bogoslovsky's song, sung by Mark Bernes in The Two Fighters (1943) film.

1913 births
2004 deaths
20th-century classical composers
20th-century classical pianists
20th-century Russian conductors (music)
20th-century Russian male musicians
Musicians from Saint Petersburg
People from Sankt-Peterburgsky Uyezd
Gnessin State Musical College alumni
Moscow Conservatory alumni
Saint Petersburg Conservatory alumni
People's Artists of the RSFSR
People's Artists of the USSR
Recipients of the Order "For Merit to the Fatherland", 3rd class
Recipients of the Order "For Merit to the Fatherland", 4th class
Recipients of the Order of the Red Banner of Labour
Recipients of the Order of the Red Star
Male classical pianists
Male operetta composers
Russian nobility
Russian classical pianists
Russian film score composers
Russian male classical composers
Russian male conductors (music)
Russian television presenters
Soviet classical pianists
Soviet conductors (music)
Soviet film score composers
Soviet male classical composers
Soviet television presenters

Burials at Novodevichy Cemetery